Inwa (also spelled Innwa; formerly Ava) is a former national capital of Burma (Myanmar).

Inwa may also mean:

 Ava Bridge:  A bridge linking Inwa and Sagaing
 INWA:  Nordic walking